Tadehagi is a genus of flowering plants in the legume family, Fabaceae. It belongs to the subfamily Faboideae. The genus comprises four accepted species with four more unresolved species.

Species
Tadehagi pseudotriquetrum (DC.) Y.C.Yang & P.H.Huang	   
Tadehagi robustum Pedley	   
Tadehagi rodgeri (Schindl.) H.Ohashi	  
Tadehagi triquetrum (L.) H.Ohashi

Unresolved species
Tadehagi alatum (DC.) H.Ohashi	  
Tadehagi andamanicum (N.P.Balakr. & N.G.Nair) S.P.Mathew 
Tadehagi auriculatum (DC.) H.Ohashi	   
Tadehagi pseudotriquetrum (DC.) H. Ohashi

References

Faboideae
Fabaceae genera
Fabales of Asia
Fabales of Australia